Hohenlinden is an unincorporated community located in Webster County, Mississippi, United States.

References

Unincorporated communities in Webster County, Mississippi
Unincorporated communities in Mississippi